Bob Schmetterer (born November 23, 1943) is an American business executive and author. He is past chairman and CEO of Euro RSCG Worldwide and past president and COO of communications group Havas.

Background 
Born in New York City, Schmetterer grew up in Hillsdale, New Jersey graduated from Pascack Valley High School in 1961. Shortly afterward, he married Tara Deppert with whom he had two sons. Schmetterer completed his BS in psychology from Fairleigh Dickinson University in 1967, and completed an MBA at the same school in 1970. While attending university, he worked for the British Motor Corporation, where he originated the idea for branding and marketing accessories for their MG and Austin-Healy sports cars as part of the company's overall marketing strategy. Then in 1968 he was hired by Volvo of America as marketing research director.

Advertising career 

Schmetterer joined creative advertising agency Scali McCabe Sloves in 1971 where his first client assignment was Perdue chicken, which would be named number 67 on Advertising Age's top 100 advertising campaigns of the 20th Century. In 1980 Schmetterer was appointed Managing Director and Chief operating officer of the New York-based Scali McCabe Sloves firm.

In 1984 Bob Schmetterer became president and chief executive officer of an international joint venture with Young & Rubicam of New York and Eurocom S.A. of Paris, France: HCM Advertising Worldwide (Havas Conseil Marsteller). In 1987 Schmetterer then became a founding partner and president of the agency to become known as Messner, Vetere, Berger, McNamee, Schmetterer (MVBMS). Under Schmetterer's leadership the company was an early innovator in digital advertising and marketing, website creation, and in the first Internet "banner ads." As a result of these kinds of innovations and progressively growing client base, MVBMS became the fastest growing agency in the United States in the early 1990s.

In 1992, after being acquired by publicly owned French group Euro RSCG, Messner, Vetere, Berger, McNamee, Schmetterer became their New York office and Schmetterer was asked to join their board of directors. Five years later, he was appointed chairman and chief executive officer of Euro RSCG Worldwide. Schmetterer remained at the helm for seven years, as the agency grew to 233 offices in 75 countries and billing grew to $13 billion. Under Schmetterer's leadership Euro RSCG became the largest digital agency worldwide. By 2000, Scott Donaton (Publisher of Advertising Age and Entertainment Weekly) called Schmetterer a "visionary for new creativity". In 2002, in addition to his chief executive role at Euro RSCG, Schmetterer was named president and chief operating officer of French advertising and communications holding company Havas. Early in 2004, Schmetterer announced his retirement after thirty-three years in the ad industry.

Schmetterer has managed the strategy and advertising for clients including Volvo cars in North America as well as globally, Pioneer Electronics, Maxell Tape, MCI, Dannon Yogurt and Intel. His advertising campaigns for Volvo also made the Advertising Age top 100 campaigns of the 20th Century list, coming in at number 90.

Author and speaker 

In 2003, Schmetterer wrote the book Leap! A Revolution in Creative Business Strategy, which was published by John Wiley & Sons and eventually translated into six additional languages: English, French, Portuguese, Spanish, Italian and Chinese. The book was based upon the concept of "Creative Business Ideas": a concept developed by Schmetterer for use at Euro RSCG (that later trademarked the idea), whereby advertising agencies would go beyond pure advertising and communications strategy, and use non-linear creative thinking to develop ideas that could become central to companies products, services, and business strategy. Schmetterer has been keynote speaker at industry conferences sponsored by the American Association of Advertising Agencies and the Cannes International Advertising Festival. In 2010 he also participated in The Future of Television Conference at New York University Stern School of Business.

Personal 

Schmetterer has been married to Stacy Chiarello Schmetterer since 1987. Together they pursue philanthropic interests in the arts, education, animals, nature, and the sea. The two are also long-time yacht enthusiasts. Schmetterer's current yacht is an 80-foot Marlow Explorer named the Blue Moon.

References 

Living people
1943 births
Fairleigh Dickinson University alumni
American chief executives
American chief operating officers
Pascack Valley High School alumni
People from Hillsdale, New Jersey